Norbanus may refer to:
 Norbana gens, family in ancient Rome
 Norbanus (wasp), a wasp genus in the subfamily Pteromalinae